Bear Creek Provincial Park is a provincial park in British Columbia, Canada. It is situated on the west side of the Okanagan Lake and is northwest of the city of Kelowna.

Facilities
The park features a beach that is over 400 meters long and hiking trails that loop around the creek and surrounding canyon. The area is also used extensively for camping.

References

External links

Provincial parks of British Columbia
Provincial parks in the Okanagan
1981 establishments in British Columbia